Flora Morris was a British stage and film actress. She played the lead in the 1915 crime film After Dark.

Selected filmography
 Oliver Twist (1912)
 Adrift on Life's Tide (1913)
 Kissing Cup (1913)
 The Heart of Midlothian (1914)
 Mysteries of London (1915)
 After Dark (1915)
 A Park Lane Scandal (1915)
 Whoso Is Without Sin (1916)

References

Bibliography
 Goble, Alan. The Complete Index to Literary Sources in Film. Walter de Gruyter, 1999.

External links

Year of birth unknown
Year of death unknown
English film actresses
English silent film actresses
20th-century English actresses
English stage actresses